This is a list of buildings that are examples of the Art Deco architectural style in Illinois, United States.

Aurora 
 Aurora Elks Lodge No. 705, Aurora, 1926
 Fox River Pavilion, Aurora, 1932
 Paramount Theatre, Aurora, 1931

Belvidere 
 Auburn Theatre, Belvidere, 1942
 Community Building, Belvidere
 Old Belvidere High School Auditorium, Belvidere, 1938

Berwyn 
 Berwyn Health Center, Berwyn, 1939
 Berwyn Municipal Building, Berwyn, 1939
 Berwyn State Bank Building, Berwyn, 1929
 Mr. Robert Silhan House, Berwyn, 1937

Champaign 
 Champaign Central High School, Champaign, 1956
 Champaign City Building, Champaign, 1937
 Christie Clinic, Champaign, 1929
 Illinois National Guard Building, Champaign

Chicago 
 33 North LaSalle, Chicago, 1930
 333 North Michigan, Chicago, 1928
 3640 North Halsted Street, Lakeview Historic District, Chicago
 4936 South Ashland Avenue, Chicago, 1939
 6422 North Western Avenue, Chicago, 1920s
 A. W. Enterprises, Inc., Chicago, 1940s
 Adler Planetarium, Chicago, 1930
 Belle Shore Apartment Hotel, Chicago, 1929
 Belmont-Sheffield Trust and Savings Bank Building, Chicago, 1928
 Buckingham Building, Chicago, 1930
 Bull Dog Lock Co., Chicago, 1947
 Carbide and Carbon Building, Chicago, 1929
 Carl Street Studios, West Burton Place Historic District, Chicago, 1927
 Century Tower, Chicago, 1930
 Chicago Beach Apartments, Chicago, 1929
 Chicago Bee Building, South Side, Chicago, 1926
 Chicago Board of Trade Building, Chicago, 1930
 Chicago Evening Post Building, West Loop–LaSalle Street Historic District, Chicago, 1928
 Chicago Federation of Musicians Building, West Loop–LaSalle Street Historic District, Chicago, 1933, 1949
 Civic Opera House, Chicago, 1929
 Clark Adams Building, Chicago, 1927
 Edward P. Russell House, Chicago, 1929
 Engineering Building, 205 West Wacker Drive, West Loop–LaSalle Street Historic District, Chicago, 1928
 Field Building, Chicago, 1928–1934
 The Fireside Bowl, Chicago, 1941
 First Church of Deliverance, Chicago, 1929
 Foreman State National Bank Building, 33 North LaSalle, West Loop–LaSalle Street Historic District, Chicago, 1930
 Frank Fisher Apartments, Chicago, 1936
 Gramercy Row Apartments, Chicago
 Grein Funeral Directors Building, Chicago, 1931
 Illinois National Guard Building, Chicago, 1940
 Nederlander Theatre, Chicago, 1926
 Jeffery Terrace Apartments, Chicago, 1929
 L. Fish Furniture Co., Chicago, 1931
 Laramie State Bank Building, Chicago, 1929
 LaSalle–Wacker Building, Chicago, 1930
 Madonna Della Strada Chapel, Loyola University Chicago, Rogers Park, Chicago, 1939
 Mark Twain Hotel, Chicago, 1930
 McGraw–Hill Building façade, Chicago, 1929
 Merchandise Mart, Chicago, 1930
 Morton Building, 208 West Washington, West Loop–LaSalle Street Historic District, Chicago, 1927
 Mundelein College, Chicago, 1930
 The Narragansett , Kenwood, Chicago, 1928
 New Bismark Hotel (now Hotel Allegro), 71 West Randolph Street, Chicago, 1926
 Northwest Tower, Chicago, 1928
 One North LaSalle Building, Chicago, 1930
 Outer Drive Bridge, Chicago, 1937
 Palmolive Building, Chicago, 1929
 Paul J. Quetschke & Co., Chicago, 1940s
 Polish National Alliance Headquarters, West Town, Chicago, 1938
 Powhatan Apartments, Chicago, 1929
 Produce Terminal Cold Storage Company Building, Near West Side, Chicago, 1929
 Rosenwald Court Apartments, Bronzeville, Chicago, 1929
 Reebie Storage Warehouse, Chicago, 1922
 Riverside Plaza, Chicago, 1929
 St. Wenceslaus Church, Chicago, 1941
 Sears Department Store, Irving Park, Chicago, 1938
 Spiegel Office Building, Bridgeport, Chicago, 1937
 Standard Sanitary Manufacturing Co., Central Manufacturing District–Original East Historic District, Chicago, 1928
 Theophil Studios, Chicago, 1940
 Transparent Package Company, Central Manufacturing District–Original East Historic District, Chicago, 1940s
 Union Park Hotel, Chicago, 1930
 Universal Studios Film Exchange, Chicago, 1937
 Valentine Chicago Boy's Club, Chicago, 1938
 Victor F. Lawson House YMCA, Chicago, 1934
 Wacker Tower, Chicago, 1928
 Wholesale Florists Exchange, Near West Side, Chicago, 1927
 William E. Dever Crib, Chicago
 Willoughby Tower, Chicago, 1929
 Windsor Beach Apartments, South Shore, Chicago, 1928

Elgin 
 Bowlway Lanes, Elgin, 1942
 Elgin Tower Building (former Home Banks Building), Elgin, 1929
 Evolution Motors (former Castle Auto Sales), Elgin, 1920s
 Illinois National Guard Building, Elgin
 Salvation Army, Elgin, 1930

Monmouth 
 Maple City Dairy, Monmouth Courthouse Commercial Historic District, Monmouth, 1935
 Rivoli Theatre, Monmouth, 1920s, 1930
 Woolworth's Building, Monmouth Courthouse Commercial Historic District, Monmouth, 1939

Oak Park 
 Forsyth Building, Oak Park, 1929
 Lake Theater, Oak Park, 1936
 Marshall Field and Company Store, Oak Park, 1928
 Medical Arts Building, Oak Park, 1929

Quincy 
 116 North 5th, Quincy
 606 Maine, Quincy
 Coca-Cola Bottling Company Building, Quincy, 1940
 Gardner Memorial Boy Scout Service Center (former Chatten House), Quincy, 1940
 Kresge's, 530 Maine Street, Quincy
 Lincoln-Douglas Apartments, Quincy, 1930
 State Theater, Quincy, 1938

Rockford 
 3603 Highcrest Road, Rockford, 1949
 Central Illinois Gas & Electric Building, 303 North Main, Rockford, 1929
 Four Squires Building (former W.T. Grant Building), Rockford, 1920s
 Illinois Bank & Trust Building, Rockford
 Illinois National Guard Armory, Rockford, 1937
 J.C. Penney Building, West Downtown Rockford Historic District, Rockford
 Jackson Piano Building/Liebling Building, Rockford, 1927
 Porter's Corner, West Downtown Rockford Historic District, Rockford, 1929
 Rockford East High School, Rockford, 1940
 Rockford Morning Star Building, Rockford, 1928
 Rockford Public Library, Nordlof Center (former S. H. Kress & Co. Building), Rockford
 Rockford West High School, Rockford, 1939
 Security Building, Co., Rockford, 1920s
 Times Theatre, Rockford, 1938

Urbana 
 Cinema Gallery (former Cinema Theater), Urbana, 1915 and 1934
 Illinois National Guard Building, Urbana
 James McLaren White's Chemistry Annex Building, Noyes Laboratory of Chemistry, University of Illinois at Urbana-Champaign, Urbana, 1930

Other cities 
 Apollo Theatre, Princeton, 1882 and 1940s
 Ariston Cafe, Litchfield, 1935
 Arlee Theater, Mason City, 1936
 Bloom High School, Chicago Heights, 1931–1934
 Campana Factory, Batavia, 1937
 Daily Times Building, Ottawa, 1939
 Du Quoin State Fairgrounds, Du Quoin, 1923
 Egyptian Theatre, DeKalb, 1929
 Fort Armstrong Theatre, Rock Island, 1920
 Fox Theatre, Centralia Commercial Historic District, Centralia, 1930
 Griesheim Building (former Kresge's), Lincoln, 1932
 Haish Memorial Library, DeKalb, 1930
 Health Education Building, Eastern Illinois University, Charleston, 1938
 Holy Trinity Roman Catholic Church, Bloomington, 1934
 Hotel Belleville, Belleville, 1931
 Illinois Building, Illinois State Fairgrounds, Springfield
 Illinois National Guard Building, Cairo, 1932
 Illinois National Guard Building, Pontiac, 1939
 Independent Order of Odd Fellows Meeting Hall, Centralia Commercial Historic District, Centralia, 1932
 Institute for Food Safety and Health, Illinois Institute of Technology, Bedford Park, 1948–49
 Joliet Regional Airport, Joliet, 1930
 Liberty Theater, Murphysboro, 1913 and 1938
 Marcucci Building, Lincoln, 1930
 Marion Veterans Affairs Medical Center, Marion, 1941
 Masonic Hall Harmony Lodge No. 3, Jacksonville, 1930s
 Masonic Temple, Danville, 1916
 Masonic Temple, Decatur, 1924
 Meredith Memorial Home (former Belleville Hotel), Belleville
 Naval Air Station Glenview Air Tower, Glenview, 1923
 New Clark Theatre, Barry, 1939
 Normal Theater, Normal, 1937
 North Shore Sanitary District Tower, Highland Park, 1931
 Paramount Theatre, Kankakee, 1931
 Pickwick Theatre, Park Ridge, 1928
 Riverside Park Bandshell, Murphysboro, 1939
 St. Charles Municipal Building, St. Charles, 1940
 Sandoval Community High School, Sandoval
 South Town Theatre, Springfield, 1915 and 1937
 State Farm Downtown Building, Bloomington, 1929
 Sterling Daily Gazette Building, Sterling, 1935
 Sycamore State Theater (former Fargo Theater), Sycamore, 1925
 Ulmer Jewelers, Harvard, 1930s
 United States Post Office, Marshall Business Historic District, Marshall, 1936
 United States Post Office and Courthouse, Peoria, 1938
 Varsity Center for the Arts, Carbondale, 1940 and 1981
 Washington Elementary School, Jacksonville, 1932
 Will Rogers Theatre, Charleston, 1935–1938
 York Theater, Elmhurst, 1924
 Zoe Theatre, Pittsfield, 1950

See also 

 List of Art Deco architecture
 List of Art Deco architecture in the United States

References 

 "Art Deco & Streamline Moderne Buildings." Roadside Architecture.com. Retrieved 2019-01-03.
 Cinema Treasures. Retrieved 2022-09-06
 "Court House Lover". Flickr. Retrieved 2022-09-06
 "New Deal Map". The Living New Deal. Retrieved 2020-12-25.
 "SAH Archipedia". Society of Architectural Historians. Retrieved 2021-11-21.

External links
 

 
Art Deco
Art Deco architecture in Illinois
Illinois-related lists